Waroid is a proposal by Granberry and Vescelius (2004) linking Warao of Venezuela with the extinct Macoris and Guanahatabey languages of the Greater Antilles.

Languages
Waroid
Warao
Caribbean
Macoris (Macorix)
Upper Macoris
Lower Macoris
Guanahatabey

See also
Pre-Arawakan languages of the Greater Antilles

References

Proposed language families
Indigenous languages of the Americas